Burrowing snake may refer to:

 Amerotyphlops brongersmianus, a harmless blind snake species found in South America
 Amerotyphlops trinitatus, a.k.a. the Trinidad burrowing snake, a harmless blind snake species found in Trinidad and Tobago
 Adelphicos nigrilatum, a harmless snake species found in Mexico
 Brazilian burrowing snake, Gomesophis brasiliensis, a harmless snake species found in Brazil
 Antaioserpens, a genus of burrowing snakes found in Australia
 Brachyurophis, a genus of burrowing snakes found in Australia
 Simoselaps, a genus of burrowing snakes found in Australia
 Adelphicos, a genus of burrowing snakes found in Central America